Robin Wayne Wilson (born 4 October 1957 in Christchurch) is a former field hockey player from New Zealand, who was a member of the national team that finished seventh at the 1984 Summer Olympics in Los Angeles, United States.

References

External links
 

New Zealand male field hockey players
Olympic field hockey players of New Zealand
Field hockey players at the 1984 Summer Olympics
Field hockey players from Christchurch
1957 births
Living people